John Webb’s or Lowe’s Mill is a Grade II* listed tower mill at Thaxted, Essex, England, which had been restored to working order, but is currently out of action following the loss of a sail in April 2010.

History

The windmill was built in 1804 for John Webb, a local farmer and landowner, to satisfy the increasing demand for flour both locally and in London. It was constructed using local materials, with timber from two local farms and bricks made at a nearby location in the Chelmer Valley also owned by John Webb.

The mill was always worked by millers named Lowe or John Webb, thus gaining its names. The mill was last worked commercially in 1910. The mill was disused for over twenty years until the Thaxted Civic Trust carried out essential repairs and made the structure waterproof. The lower floors were used as a scout hut. The mill passed into the ownership of Thaxted Parish Council in the 1950s. The Thaxted Society, formed in 1964, has been instrumental in the restoration of the mill to full working order.

In 2004, the cap and sails were removed to enable repairs to the brickwork at the top of the tower. The repairs were completed by the end of the year. The mill was officially reopened on 8 April 2005 by Lord Petre. On 5 April 2010, the stock of one pair of sails broke, and the sail crashed to the ground, damaging the stage as it fell. There were no injuries among the six or seven visitors in the mill at the time. On the ground and first floors there is a rural museum containing agricultural artifacts.

Description

John Webb’s Mill is a five-storey tower mill with a domed cap with a gallery. The cap is winded by an eight blade fantail. There is a stage at first floor level. The tower is  diameter at base level and  diameter at curb level.

The cast-iron windshaft carries a clasp arm brake wheel with 88 cogs. It drives a wooden wallower with 50 cogs carried on a cast iron upright shaft. The  clasp arm great spur wheel has 122 cogs and drives three stone nuts – two with 19 cogs and the third with 20 cogs.

As built, John Webb’s Mill had a wooden windshaft some  longer than the present one, carrying four Common sails. It drove two pairs of millstones, the third pair being added at a later date. In 1890, the mill was carrying four double Patent sails and by the early 1900s was working on two double Patent sails and two single Patent sails.

Millers
John Webb 1823
Lowe 1837
John Webb 1848–1853
Harry Lowe 1907–1910

Public access

The mill is open in the afternoon on Sundays and Bank Holidays from May to September and at other times by appointment.

Cultural relevance 
The windmill briefly reached an international audience when it was used in a scene in Passolini's 1972 adaptation of The Canterbury Tales. The mill, in its dilapidated state prior to restoration, provides a backdrop to the conversation between the Summoner, the Devil and the Old Woman in The Friar's Tale. The use of a 19th century tower mill in a depiction of medieval England is anachronistic.

References

External links
Windmill World webpage on John Webb’s Mill

Windmills in Essex
History of Essex
Grade II* listed buildings in Essex
Tower mills in the United Kingdom
Grinding mills in the United Kingdom
Windmills completed in 1804
Thaxted
Grade II* listed windmills
Museums in Essex
Mill museums in England